Acanthostigma filiforme is a species of fungus in the Tubeufiaceae family of fungi. It was isolated from decomposing wood in the Great Smoky Mountains National Park. A. filiforme differs from its cogenerate species by having longer ascospores with more septa.

References

Further reading

External links

MycoBank

Tubeufiaceae